Peru Community Schools (PCS) is a public school district in Peru, Indiana, United States. It is responsible for two elementary schools, one combined junior/senior high school, and one alternative school. The school district's current enrollment is about 2,323 students. Peru High School has a 96% graduation rate. And the district has approximately 84% state ISTEP pass rate for Math and 86% pass rate of state ISTEP in Language Arts. Peru Community Schools has been recognized as a high growth and achievement school over the past 5 years.

Schools

Source: School Data: Peru Community Schools 2009

See also
 List of school districts in Indiana

External links
 Peru Community Schools

References 

School districts in Indiana
Education in Miami County, Indiana